Isaac Howard (born March 30, 2004) is an American collegiate ice hockey left wing for Minnesota Duluth of the National Collegiate Athletic Association (NCAA). He was drafted 31st overall by the Tampa Bay Lightning in the 2022 NHL Entry Draft.

Playing career
Howard is committed to play college ice hockey for the Minnesota Duluth Bulldogs during the 2022–23 season. Howard competed at the 2022 BioSteel All-American Game.

He was drafted in the first round, 31st overall, by the Tampa Bay Lightning in the 2022 NHL Entry Draft.

International play

Howard represented the United States at the 2020 Winter Youth Olympics and won a silver medal.

Howard represented the United States at the 2021 IIHF World U18 Championships, where he recorded one goal and three assists in five games. He again represented the United States at the 2022 IIHF World U18 Championships, where he was the leading scorer for the United States, with six goals and five assists in six games and won a silver medal.

Career statistics

Regular season and playoffs

International

References

External links
 

2004 births
Living people
Ice hockey people from Wisconsin
Ice hockey players at the 2020 Winter Youth Olympics
Minnesota Duluth Bulldogs men's ice hockey players
National Hockey League first-round draft picks
People from Hudson, Wisconsin
Tampa Bay Lightning draft picks
USA Hockey National Team Development Program players
Youth Olympic silver medalists for the United States